NoShame, or NoShame Films, was an Italian-American company specializing in releasing authoritative editions of cult Italian movies on DVD.

History
NoShame Films started its office in Italy and opened an office in Los Angeles, California the following year. Its specialty was remastering and releasing cult Italian films on DVD from such subgenres as giallo and poliziotteschi. The company was praised by DVD collectors for the amount of effort that went into its releases, which included thick booklets and plenty of special features.

In 2006 the company quietly went out of business, amid rumors of content/privacy lawsuits initiated by a former Mayfair Model, with its website going offline and all future releases being cancelled. Its previously released DVDs also started to go out of print. A new DVD company, MYA Communications, releases many films along the same lines as NoShame and has even slowly started to re-issue some of NoShame's out-of-print films.

DVD releases
Almost Human
Uno Bianca
The Big Alligator River
Boccaccio '70
The Case of the Scorpion's Tail
Colt 38 Special Squad / La Bidonata
Convoy Busters
Dark Waters
Devil in the Flesh
Double Game / Tony: Another Double Game
Emergency Squad
The Emilio Miraglia Killer Queen Box Set (The Night Evelyn Came Out of the Grave / The Red Queen Kills Seven Times)
Gambling City
Giovannona Long-Thigh
Last Days of Mussolini
The Last Round
Love and Anger
Luciano Ercoli's The Death Box Set (Death Walks at Midnight / Death Walks on High Heels)
A Man Called Magnum
Massacre in Rome
The Most Beautiful Wife
Open Letter to the Evening News
Padre Pio, Miracle Man
Partner
The Railroad Man
Roma Citta Libera
Secrets of a Call Girl
Secret Sex Tape of a Centerfold - Francesca
The Sensuous Nurse
St. Francis
Story of a Cloistered Nun
Story of a Love Affair
The Strange Vice of Mrs Wardh
The Desert of the Tartars
Ubalda, All Naked and Warm
The Valerio Zurlini Box Set: The Early Masterpieces
A Whisper in the Dark
Yesterday, Today and Tomorrow
Your Vice Is a Locked Room and Only I Have the Key

Notes

External links
 Myspace

DVD companies
Home video companies of the United States